Solomon of Dover was Archdeacon of Leicester from 1252 to 1274: he was also Prebendary of St Margaret, Leicester in Lincoln Cathedral.

Notes

See also
 Diocese of Lincoln
 Diocese of Peterborough
 Diocese of Leicester
 Archdeacon of Leicester

Archdeacons of Leicester
People from Dover, Kent
13th-century English people
Lincoln Cathedral